Westhoughton is a town and civil parish in the Metropolitan Borough of Bolton, Greater Manchester, England,  southwest of Bolton,  east of Wigan and  northwest of Manchester.

Within the boundaries of the historic county of Lancashire, Westhoughton was once a centre for coal mining, cotton-spinning and textile manufacture. It had a population of 24,974 at the 2011 Census.

Westhoughton incorporates several former villages and hamlets which have their own distinctive character, sports traditions and amenities, including Wingates, White Horse, Over Hulton, Four Gates, Chequerbent, Hunger Hill, Snydale, Hart Common, Marsh Brook, Daisy Hill and Dobb Brow.

History

Toponymy
The name Westhoughton is derived from the Old English, halh (dialectal "haugh") for a nook or corner of land, and 'tun for a farmstead or settlement – meaning a "westerly settlement in a corner of land". It has been recorded variously as Halcton in 1210, Westhalcton in 1240,Westhalghton in 1292, Westhalton in 1302 and in the 16th century as Westhaughton and Westhoughton.Billington, W.D. (1982). From Affetside to Yarrow : Bolton place names and their history, Ross Anderson Publications

The people of Westhoughton are sometimes known as "Howfeners" (from Houghton) or "Keaw-yeds" (cow heads) or "Keawyedners" (a combination of the two), and the town is known as "Keawyed City". Supposed folklore ("re-invented" in the Edwardian period) describes a farmer who found his cow with its head stuck in a five barred gate, and, rather than damage the gate, cut the cow's head off, as the cow cost less than the gate. The village of Tideswell in Derbyshire shares this same legend.

Banastre Rebellion
In 1315 a group of men led by Sir William Bradshaigh of Haigh Hall, Sir Henry Lea of Charnock Richard and Sir Adam Banastre met at Wingates to plan a campaign of violence against Sir Robert de Holland of Upholland, chief retainer of the powerful Earl of Lancaster. The campaign came to be known as the Banastre Rebellion and ended with the deaths of most of the main protagonists.

Civil War
On 15 December 1642, during the English Civil War, the Battle of Warcock Hill was fought on Westhoughton Common between Lord Derby's Cavalier forces and Parliamentarians. The site of the battle was off the Manchester Road where Wayfaring is today. The Parliamentarians under Captains Bradshaw, Venables and Browne ran into a force of some thousand Royalists from the Wigan garrison under Lord Derby and were forced to surrender. The three captains and 160 men were taken prisoner.

It is believed that Prince Rupert of the Rhine gathered his troops in Westhoughton before the attack and ensuing massacre at Bolton in 1644. Civil War activity is also known to have occurred around the site of Hunger Hill and a sword claimed to be from the time of the Civil War was discovered in the garden of one of the cottages at Pocket Nook in Chew Moor during the 1950s.

Industrial Revolution

On 25 March 1812 a group of Luddites burned Rowe and Dunscough's Westhoughton Mill. Twelve people were arrested on the orders of William Hulton, the High Sheriff of Lancashire.Cotton Times – Luddites: War against the machines – Page 2 . URL accessed 22 May 2007. James Smith, Thomas Kerfoot, John (or Job) Fletcher and Abraham Charlston, were sentenced to death for their part in the attack. The Charlston family claimed that Abraham was only twelve years old; but he was not reprieved. The men were publicly hanged outside Lancaster Castle on 13 June 1812. It was reported that Abraham cried for his mother on the scaffold. By this time, however, hanging of those under 18 was rare and of those under 16, in practice, abolished. Nine others were transported to Australia. The riots are commemorated by a blue plaque on the White Lion public house opposite the mill site.

In 1891 the Rose Hill Doubling Mill had 8,020 spindles and Higson and Biggs' Victoria Mill had 40,000 spindles.
Bolton Road Mill housed 564 looms weaving shirtings and Perseverance Mill had 600 looms manufacturing twills, sateens and plain cotton cloth. The looms in John Chadwick's Silk Mills produced broad silks, tie silks, scarves and handkerchiefs. The Lancashire Hosiery Company produced vests. Thomas Welch was a calico printer at the Green Vale Print Works.

The family of William Hulton of Hulton Park owned many small collieries from the 16th century. After 1828 the pits at Chequerbent were served by the Bolton and Leigh Railway. The Hulton Colliery Company sank Chequerbent Colliery in 1892 and Bank Pit Nos 1–4 between 1897 and 1901. The company mined the Trencherbone, Plodder and Arley seams. Bank Pit No 3, known as the Pretoria Pit, was the site of one Britain's worst coal-mining disasters when on 21 December 1910, 344 men and boys died in an explosion of firedamp. The Pretoria Pit Disaster was the third worst in British mining history, after the 1866 Barnsley Oaks Disaster in Yorkshire, and the 1913 Senghenydd Colliery Disaster in Glamorgan. A memorial erected in 1910 is Grade II listed.

In 1896 the Wigan Coal and Iron Company's Eatock Pits employed 484 underground and 89 surface workers whilst the Hewlett Pits, at Hart Common, employed 981 underground and 182 on the surface.

Governance
Lying within the boundaries of Lancashire since the early 12th century, Westhoughton was a chapelry and township in the ecclesiastical parish of Deane, in the Salford hundred. In 1837, Westhoughton joined with other townships (or civil parishes) to form the Bolton Poor Law Union and took joint responsibility for the administration and funding of the Poor Law in that area. In 1872, a Local board of health was established for the township, but was superseded in 1894 by the creation of Westhoughton Urban District which shared local government responsibilities with Lancashire County Council. In 1898 most of Over Hulton became part of the urban district. Westhoughton Town Hall was built in 1903 to a plan by Bradshaw and Gass, architects of Bolton replacing the Local Board Offices at the junction of Market Street and Wigan Road.

Under the Local Government Act 1972, Westhoughton Urban District was abolished in 1974 and its area became a civil parish of the newly created Metropolitan Borough of Bolton in Greater Manchester. It is represented by six councillors elected in two borough wards – Westhoughton North and Chew Moor and Westhoughton South –  on the metropolitan borough council.

Westhoughton civil parish, gained town council status in 1985, and has 18 town councillors elected from six town council wards – Central, Chequerbent, Daisy Hill, Hoskers and Hart Common, White Horse, and Wingates. Each year the town council elects a town mayor.

Parliamentary representation
For 98 years, between 1885 and 1983 the Westhoughton constituency represented the town. Although, since 1906, always returning a Labour candidate, the elections were, after 1950, a close run contest, due to the working class conservatism found in Westhoughton and surrounding areas and the inclusion of more rural (Conservative) areas in boundary revision. At the 1906 general election, the birth of the modern Labour Party, William Tyson Wilson was one of 29 successful Labour Representation Committee candidates.

The constituency had by-elections in 1921, 1951 and 1973 due to the retirement, ill-health or death of the sitting MPs. The last MP for Westhoughton was Roger Stott (Labour) who, on abolition of the Westhoughton constituency, was elected MP for Wigan in 1983.

The 1983 redistribution of seats reflected local government reforms made in 1974. In September 2011, the Boundary Commission for England proposed recreating a Westhoughton constituency to incorporate Westhoughton, Blackrod, Hindley, Atherton, and parts of Horwich and LeighInitial Proposals – Greater Manchester  Boundary Commission for England

Geography
Borsdane Brook separates the township from Aspull, another brook divides it from Hindley joining a stream which rises on the northern edge of Westhoughton and flows south through Leigh to Glazebrook. The town incorporates several former villages and hamlets including railway stations including Wingates, White Horse, Over Hulton, Four Gates (or Fourgates), Chequerbent, Hunger Hill, Snydale, Hart Common, Marsh Brook, Daisy Hill and Dobb Brow.

Local Nature Reserves are located at Hall Lee Bank Park, Cunningham Clough, and Eatock Lodge at Daisy Hill.

Demography

Education

The long established St John's, Wingates CE Primary & Fourgates County Primary schools were closed in 2004 following amalgamation to form The Gates CP School. Westhoughton CP School closed in 2008. An earlier round of reorganisation saw the closure of Hart Common Primary School and opening of St George's on The Hoskers, and the closure of the tiny County Primary at White Horse which is now a private nursery.

Religion
 
Westhoughton's old chapel of 1552 was replaced by a brick-built church in 1731 and the parish church in 1869–70. Dedicated to Saint Bartholomew, it had an east window depicting the twelve apostles. In 1990, the church was gutted by fire, but the tower was saved, and is Grade II listed. A new church, designed by architects Dane, Ashworth & Cottam, was built at a cost of about £1 million, and consecrated in 1995 by the Bishop of Manchester. Nicholsons of Malvern built its two manual organs with 1,256 pipes, ranging from 1/2 inch to  made of tin, spotted metal and hammered lead.

Other Anglican churches include St John the Evangelist, in the Parish of Wingates, and St James the Great, in the Parish of Daisy Hill. St James' is a Grade II* listed building. 

The Roman Catholic Sacred Heart parish church fell into disrepair; it was demolished and replaced by a new building incorporating a church hall.

John Wesley preached a sermon at Barnaby's Farm in Wingates in 1784. Services were held in cottages opposite the farm before the first Methodist church was built in 1835. Another Methodist Church was built in Dixon Street in 1871. Houses occupy the site of Westhoughton Independent Methodist Church, where Wesley once stood, but the stone, from which he preached, was moved to Grove Lane Chapel, now Westhoughton Methodist Church's church hall. The final service was held by the Independent Methodist Church in 2001 and the church was subsequently demolished. Daisy Hill Methodist Church was closed and demolished in the late 1980s. The new, Methodist church was built adjacent to Grove Lane Chapel, which now serves as church hall.

The industrial north west was a focus for non-conformism, and until the 1990s the Church of the Nazarene stood in Church Street. The Quaker Meeting House is now a Christian fellowship, and a tin tabernacle was situated off Bolton Road. There is a Pentecostal church, a United Reformed Church, The Bethel, and an independent church on Tithbarn Street.

Landmarks

Snydle water tower was built by Westhoughton Council in 1914 and lay derelict for many years with its tank removed and the tower open to the sky. It has been restored and converted into a private dwelling that is visible from the M61 motorway.

The Church of England School built in 1861, opposite St Bartholomew's church, is a Grade II listed building as are houses at 110 and 112, Market Street. The school, which was known as Westhoughton Parochial School, has been renamed St Bartholomew's Church of England, Primary School.

The red brick and terracotta town hall and Carnegie library were built between 1902 and 1904 to the designs of Bradshaw & Gass.

Transport
The M61 motorway passes through the north of the town which it serves by junctions 5 and 6. The A58 and the A6 cross the town as do the B5236, the B5235, and the B5239. The motorway separated the townships of Hunger Hill and Chew Moor from the rest of Westhoughton and the Bolton Road was completely severed. A new link road, Snydle Way, was built between Chequerbent and a spur to the old Bolton Road, via a roundabout at M61 junction 5. Snydle Way, a broad, dual carriageway, was built to full 4 lane motorway standard, with a broad centre verge allowing widening to 6 lanes. The original intention was that it would form the beginning of a new motorway, running southwest, linking the M61 with the M6. Although the route was fully allocated and all planning and public consultation completed, the project was shelved due to financial constraints.

Trains from Westhoughton to  run via ; trains from Daisy Hill to  run via .
 
In the late 1980s, a railway station planned for Dobb Brow was not built.  and  stations, to the north, also serve the town. The annual usage of Daisy Hill and Westhoughton stations was more than 500,000 passengers in 2013/14, greater than many major UK towns.
 
Electric trams to Bolton served Westhoughton until 1947 after 23 years of service. On 19 December 1924, the Bolton to Deane service was extended to Westhoughton).

Westhoughton is served by bus services to Bolton, Wigan and Leigh. The most frequent service between Bolton and Wigan is operated by Stagecoach Manchester. Other services between Leigh and Horwich are operated by Diamond Bus North West and Stagecoach. The Blackrod – Little Lever service is operated by Diamond Bus North West and Bolton to Westhoughton by Arriva North West, continuing to Wigan by Diamond Bus North West.

Media

The weekly Horwich and Westhoughton Journal was published (by The Bolton News) from 1925 until 1980, and had an editorial and revenue office in Market Street.

The town's Carnegie library is at the rear of the Town Hall. Its Carnegie Hall is used for meetings and other activities. A small museum has exhibits that relate to the Pretoria Pit Disaster and a large, encased model, of the original St Bartholomew's Parish Church, built from match-sticks.

Notable residents

Robert Shaw (1927–1978)– actor, born at 51 King Street on 9 August 1927. Shaw appeared in From Russia With Love, A Man for All Seasons, The Sting and Jaws.
Rev. Peter Ditchfield – historian and author
Bill Farrimond – cricketer, played for England.
Ethel Johnson – sprinter, represented England at the 1932 Los Angeles Summer Olympics
Jack Bruton (1903–1986) – footballer for Bolton Wanderers, Burnley and England.
Francis Lee – footballer for Bolton Wanderers, Manchester City, Derby County and England (27 caps).
Dick Pollard – cricketer, played for England.
Maxine Peake - actress, was born in Westhoughton on 14 July 1974. 
Houghton Weavers – a folk group who had a BBC Television series, Sit thi' Deawn'', in the 1970s, and a radio show.
Wingates Band - one of the best-known brass bands in the United Kingdom. Formed in 1873.

Freedom of the Parish
The following people and military units have received the Freedom of the Parish of Westhoughton.

Individuals
 Peter L. Finch: 5 March 2019, Former Mayor of Westhoughton and Mayor of Bolton.

See also

 Listed buildings in Westhoughton
 Chequerbent railway station 
 Chequerbent railway station (1831) 
 Borsdane Wood
 Daisy Hill F.C.
 Westhoughton Greyhound Track
 List of mining disasters in Lancashire

References

External links

 Westhoughton Community Network
 SWAN (Save Westhoughton Act Now)
 Parish of Westhoughton
 More information and photos of Westhoughton
 Westhoughton Online

 
Towns in Greater Manchester
Civil parishes in Greater Manchester
Geography of the Metropolitan Borough of Bolton